Daniel Bar-Tal (born 1946) is an Israeli academic, author and Branco Weiss Professor of Research in Child Development and Education at School of Education, Tel Aviv University.

Biography 
Bar-Tal was born in Stalinabad, Tajikistan, USSR in 1946, but lived his childhood in Szczecin, Poland until his immigration to Israel in 1957. In Israel he completed his undergraduate studies at Tel Aviv University.

Bar-Tal has pursued his graduate training in social psychology at the University of Pittsburgh, where he completed his doctoral dissertation in 1974.  He stayed at Pittsburgh Learning Research and Development Center for postdoctoral studies during 1975.  

In 1975, Bar-Tal returned to Tel Aviv University. His teaching career has been at Tel Aviv.  He served as a Director of the Walter Lebach Research Institute for Jewish-Arab Coexistence through Education from 2002 through 2005. He was a Co-editor in Chief of the Palestine Israel Journal from 2001 through 2005. He also served as the President of the International Society of Political Psychology from 1999 through 2000.

Awards
 In 1991, his paper "The Israeli-Palestinian Conflict; A Cognitive Analysis" won the Otto Klineberg Intercultural and International Relations Prize of the Society for the Psychological Study of Social Issues (SPSSI). 
 In 2002, his paper, titled, Why does Fear Override Hope, won the second place in the same competition. 
 In 2006, Stereotypes and Prejudice in Conflict, received the Alexander George Award of the International Society of Political Psychology for the best book in Political Psychology. In 2006 he also received Peace Scholar Award of the Peace and Justice Studies Association.
 In 2009, his paper “Reconciliation as a foundation of culture of peace” won again the Otto Klineberg Intercultural and International Relations Prize of SPSSI. 
 In 2011 he received the Lasswell Award of the International Society of Political Psychology for distinguished scientific contribution in the field of political psychology. 
 In 2012 he received the Nevitt Sanford Award of the International Society of Political Psychology for engaging in the practical application of political psychological principles, and creating knowledge that is accessible and used by practitioners to make a positive difference in the way politics is carried out.  
 In 2013 he received an honorary membership of the Polish Society of Social Psychology. 
 In 2014 he received the Morton Deutsch Conflict Resolution Award of the Society for the Study of Peace, Conflict, and Violence, Division 48 of American Psychological Association. The prize is given to an individual who has made notable contributions to the integration of theory and practice in the field of conflict resolution.

Work 
Since the early 1980s his interest has shifted to political psychology. First, he was interested in shared beliefs in groups and societies, in general studying their formation, function and change. Later he directed most of his attention to the study of the socio-psychological foundations of intractable conflicts and peace building, including reconciliation.

Socio-psychological infrastructure in times of intractable conflict 
In the latter area, he studied how socio-psychological infrastructure evolve in times of intractable conflict. This infrastructure was found to consist of shared societal beliefs of the ethos of the conflict,  collective memory, and emotional collective orientations. Bar-Tal has examined the contents, acquisition, functions, of societal mechanisms, as well as their contribution to the crystallization of social identity and development of the culture of a society in conflict during the conflict.

Socio-psychological barriers to peacemaking 
Bar-Tal has also studied socio-psychological barriers to peacemaking and ways to overcome them. He also examined the required changes in this socio-psychological repertoire for conflict resolution and reconciliation. Specifically, he proposed a conceptual framework allowing for reconciliation, peace education and eventually peace culture to evolve. In addition, in order to understand maintenance of conflicts Bar-Tal studied acquisition of the conflict repertoire of children and adolescents.

Bar-Tal developed with his collaborators theoretical frameworks for concepts like siege mentality, intractable conflict, security, patriotism, delegitimization, ethos of conflict, changing collective memory, collective emotional orientation, socio-psychological infrastructure, culture of conflict, coping psychologically with occupation, acquisition of intergroup psychological repertoire, political socialization of young children in intractable conflict, transitional context, collective identity, process of peace building, reconciliation, ethos of peace, culture of peace, barriers to peace making and ways to overcome them, peace education, struggle of narratives, routinization and self-censorship.

Research of conflicts and their resolution 
In 1999 Bar-Tal has founded a learning community dedicated to the research of conflicts and their resolution. The community consists of ten to fifteen graduate and post-graduate students, mostly for doctoral degree, who have excelled in their studies. The students, arrive from leading universities in and outside Israel and study for various related degrees, carry their studies regarding conflicts and their resolution. The learning community serves as a framework for learning, reflecting, debating, and developing; carrying conceptual and empirical studies; socialization for academic career and societal involvement; and for social support.

Selected publications 
Bar-Tal has published twenty books and over two hundreds articles and chapters in major social and political psychological journals, books and encyclopedias. A selection:
 Bar-Tal, D. (1976). Prosocial behavior: Theory and research. New York: Halsted Press.
 Bar-Tal, D. (1990). Group beliefs: A conception for analyzing group structure, processes and behavior. New York: Springer-Verlag.
 Bar-Tal, D. (2000). Shared beliefs in a society: Social psychological analysis. Thousand Oaks, CA: Sage.
 Bar-Tal, D., & Teichman, Y. (2005). Stereotypes and prejudice in conflict: Representations of Arabs in Israeli Jewish society. Cambridge: Cambridge University Press.
 Bar-Tal, D. (2007). Living with the conflict: Socio-psychological analysis of the Israeli-Jewish society. Jerusalem: Carmel. (in Hebrew)
 Bar-Tal, D., & Saxe, L. (Eds.), (1978). Social psychology of education: Theory and research. New York: Halsted.
 Frieze, I., Bar-Tal, D., & Carroll, J.S. (Eds.), (1979). New approaches to social problems: Applications of attribution theory. San Francisco: Jossey-Bass. (Sponsored by SPISSI).
 Staub, F., Bar-Tal, D., Karylowski, J., & Reykowski, J. (Eds.), (1984). Development and maintenance of prosocial behavior. New York: Plenum.
 Stroebe, W., Kruglanski, A., Bar-Tal, D., & Hewstone, M. (Eds), (1988). The social psychology of intergroup conflict. New York: Springer-Verlag.
 Bar-Tal, D., & Kruglanski, A. (Eds.) (1988). The social psychology of knowledge. Cambridge: Cambridge University Press.
 Bar-Tal, D., Graumann, C., Kruglanski, A.W., & Stroebe, W. (Eds.), (1989). Stereotypes and prejudice: Changing conceptions.  New York: Springer-Verlag.
 Bar-Tal, D., & Staub, E. (Eds.) (1997).  Patriotism in the life of individuals and nations. Chicago: Nelson-Hall.
 Bar-Tal, D., Jacobson, D., & Klieman, A. (Eds.) (1998). Security concerns: Insights from the Israeli experience.  Stamford, CT:  JAI.
 Raviv, A., Oppenheimer, L., & Bar-Tal, D. (Eds.) (1999). How children understand war and peace:  A call for international peace education. San Francisco: Jossey Bass.
 Ben-Amos, A., & Bar-Tal, D. (Eds.)(2004). Patriotism: Homeland love Tel Aviv: Hakibbutz Hameuhad (in Hebrew).
 Bar-Tal, D. (Ed.), (2011) Intergroup conflicts and their resolution: Social psychological perspective. New York: Psychology Press
 Bar-Tal D., & Schnell I. (Eds.) (2012). The Impacts of Lasting Occupation: Lessons from Israeli Society (Series in Political Psychology). Oxford University Press, USA 
 Bar-Tal, D. (2013). Intractable Conflicts: Socio-Psychological Foundations and Dynamics. Cambridge: Cambridge University Press.

References 

1946 births
Living people
Israeli psychologists
Social psychologists
Academic staff of Tel Aviv University
Academic staff of the University of Palermo
People from Dushanbe